Amir Houshang Saadati (born September 23, 1981) is an Iranian football defender who currently plays for Damash Gilan F.C. in the Azadegan League.

Club career
Saadati previously played for DSV Leoben in the Austrian First Division.

References

Iranian footballers
Association football defenders
Saipa F.C. players
Iranian expatriate footballers
People from Tehran
1981 births
Living people
Sepahan S.C. footballers
DSV Leoben players
Damash Gilan players
Damash Iranian players